The oozlum bird, also spelled ouzelum, is a legendary creature found in Australian and British folk tales and legends.  Some versions have it that, when startled, the bird will take off and fly around in ever-decreasing circles until it manages to fly up its own backside, disappearing completely, which adds to its rarity. Other sources state that the bird flies backwards so that it can admire its own beautiful tail feathers, or because while it does not know where it is going, it likes to know where it has been. 

The Oxford English Dictionary describes it as "[a] mythical bird displaying ridiculous behaviour" and speculates that the word could have been suggested by the word ouzel, meaning a blackbird (Turdus merula). The earliest citation recorded by the dictionary dates from 1858.

A variant of the oozlum, possibly a mutation, is the weejy weejy bird, which has only one wing which causes it to fly in tighter, faster, smaller circles, until it disappears up its own fundament. The oozlefinch is an American relative without feathers that flies backwards ("to keep dust, trivia, and other inconsequentia out of his eyes") at supersonic speeds, and preys on enemy bombers, which it rips from the sky. The oozlefinch has been adopted as the unofficial mascot of the United States Air Defense Artillery.

The oozlum bird was the subject of the 1970 British film Carry On Up the Jungle. There was also a recurring joke in an episode of the BBC radio comedy, The Navy Lark that Lt Commander Murray (Stephen Murray) did not know what the oozlum bird was. Sub Lieutenant Phillips (Leslie Phillips) suggested that when young, oozlum birds fly straight, and it is only when they turn left that the trouble starts.

The oozlum bird is sometimes used as a symbol of self-reference and circular argumentation. For example, author Charles Seife wrote: "Like the mythical oozlum bird, Wikipedia seems to have the ability to fly around in ever decreasing circles until it flies right up its own rectum."

The fabulous qualities of the oozlum bird are the subject of a poem by W. T. Goodge (1862–1909). In the poem The Oozlum Bird, the bird is said to fly backwards and has the singular ability of being able to fly up in the air while letting the earth turn under it. The bird is said to be large enough to bear the weight of a man.

The Trajectory of the Oozlum Bird 
Contrary to popular folklore, there are no such things as ever decreasing circles (despite what Nigel Farage says on GB News). A circle by definition is the locus of two-dimensional motion at a constant radial displacement about a central point (for the purposes of this discussion at constant speed). Again for the purposes of this discussion, we shall assume that the oozlum bird moves at constant unidirectional planar angular velocity about a central point, but that its radial displacement will decrease at any time in proportion to its remaining magnitude. If, for the sake of argument the radius decays by 0.05% for every 10 degrees of rotation, then after 10 degrees, it will be 99.5% of its original value, after 20 degrees 99.0025%, after 30 degrees 98.5074875% and so on. In terms of revolutions to one decimal place, after one revolution its radial displacement will be 83.4% of the original; after 2 revolutions 69.7%; after 3 revolutions 58.2%; after 4 revolutions 48.6%; after 5 revolutions 40.6%; after 6 revolutions 33.9%; after 7 revolutions 28.3%; after 8 revolutions 23.6%; after 9 revolutions 19.7%; after 10 revolutions 16.4% and so on and so forth. Its speed will decline commensurately with this. If the oozlum bird were of infinitesimal size, it would approach but be asymptotic to its fundament as its speed declines. In reality, being of finite size, it will reach it, disappear and hence its rarity. If you were to turn the plane of its trajectory vertical and plot it against a perpendicular time base through the centre, you would have a trace of classic damped harmonic motion.

See also
 Oozlefinch

References

Legendary birds
British legendary creatures
Australian legendary creatures